Markiyeh may refer to:
 Markiyeh, Masal
 Markiyeh, Sowme'eh Sara
 Markiyeh Rural District, in Sowme'eh Sara